Alcorn is a surname. Notable people with the surname include:

In arts and entertainment 
 Coco Love Alcorn, Canadian jazz singer
 John Alcorn (singer), Canadian jazz singer
 John Alcorn (artist) (1935–1992), American artist
 Michael Alcorn (born 1962), Irish composer
 Olive Ann Alcorn (1900–1975), American silent film actress
 Susan Alcorn (born 1953), American musician
 Emmy Alcorn, Canadian theatre developer and producer
 Michael Thomas Lamar Alcorn, Actor and special effects artist

In government and politics 
 George Oscar Alcorn (1850–1930), Canadian politician
 James L. Alcorn (1816–1894), American politician
 Meade Alcorn (1907–1992), American politician

In science and technology 
 Allan Alcorn (born 1948), American computer scientist
 George Edward Alcorn Jr. (born 1940), American physicist
 Steve Alcorn (born 1956), American electronics engineer and inventor

In sport 
 Gary Alcorn (1936–2006), American basketball player
 Jenifer Alcorn (born 1970), American boxer
 John "James" Alcorn Rector (1884–1949), American athlete
 Zac Alcorn (born 1980), American football player

Other people 
 Gay Alcorn, Australian newspaper editor
 Leelah Alcorn (1997–2014), American teenager who committed suicide and subsequently drew attention to transgender issues

See also 
 Alcorn County, Mississippi, a Mississippi county named after James Lusk Alcorn
 Alcorn McBride, electronics manufacturers
 Alcorn School District
 Alcorn State University, in Mississippi and its college football team, the Alcorn Braves
 Alcorn State University Historic District
 Alcorn's pocket gopher

References 

English-language surnames